The Frauen DFB-Pokal 1983–84 was the 4th season of the cup competition, Germany's second-most important title in women's football. In the final which was held in Frankfurt on 31 May 1984 SSG Bergisch Gladbach defeated VfR Eintracht Wolfsburg 2–0, thus claiming their third cup title.

Participants

First round

Quarter-finals

Semi-finals

Final

See also 

 1983–84 DFB-Pokal men's competition

References 

Fra
DFB-Pokal Frauen seasons